Charadrahyla pinorum is a species of frog in the family Hylidae. It is endemic to the Pacific slopes of Sierra Madre del Sur between central Guerrero and southwestern and central Oaxaca, Mexico. Common names pine wood treefrog and Mexican pine woods treefrog have been proposed for it. Its closest relative is probably Charadrahyla juanitae.

Description
Adult males measure  and adult females, based on a single specimen only,  in snout–vent length; both Charadrahyla pinorum and Charadrahyla juanitae are small in comparison to other Charadrahyla . The snout in males is rounded in dorsal profile and truncate to rounded in lateral profile. The tympanum is not visible. Adult males have vocal slits. Coloration typically includes conspicuous orange to salmon flash colors, but may occasionally be just gray. Chocolate brown to black middorsal stripe is either complete or entirely absent.

Habitat and conservation
It is often found in shallow water or on low vegetation alongside mountain streams. The tadpoles develop in streams. They have been seen to feed on mangos fallen into a stream and being predated by crabs and Belostoma diving bugs.

Charadrahyla pinorum is an uncommon species. It is threatened by habitat loss caused by small-scale agriculture, livestock, and illegal logging. Chytridiomycosis might also be a threat. It is not known to occur in protected areas.

References

pinorum
Frogs of North America
Endemic amphibians of Mexico
Taxa named by Edward Harrison Taylor
Amphibians described in 1937
Taxonomy articles created by Polbot